Brian Cantwell Smith is a philosopher and cognitive scientist working in the fields of cognitive science, computer science, information studies, and philosophy, especially ontology.

His research has focused on the foundations and philosophy of computing, both in the practice and theory of computer science, and in the use of computational metaphors in other fields, such as philosophy, cognitive science, physics, and art. He is currently professor of information, computer science, and philosophy at University of Toronto.

Career 
Smith received his BS, MS and PhD degrees from the Massachusetts Institute of Technology. Smith's 1982 doctoral dissertation  introduced the notion of computational reflection in programming languages, an area of active ongoing research in computer science. Past publications have addressed questions in computational reflection, meta-level architecture, programming languages, and knowledge representation. Over the last decade, his work has focused on fundamental issues in the foundations of epistemology, ontology, and metaphysics.

He was a founder of the Center for the Study of Language and Information at Stanford University, and a founder and first president of Computer Professionals for Social Responsibility. Smith served as principal scientist at the Xerox Palo Alto Research Center, in the 1980s.

Smith is the author of more than 35 articles and three books,. One of his books is called On the Origin of Objects, MIT Press, 1996. He had promised for several years that he is about to publish a seven-volume series entitled The Age of Significance: An Essay on the Origins of Computation and Intentionality but so far only a forty-three page introduction has been released.

Smith was Dean of the University of Toronto Faculty of Information from 2003–2008.

Smith previously held a Canada Research Chair in the Foundations of Information, and is cross-appointed as Professor in the departments of Philosophy and Computer Science and in the Program in Communication, Culture and Technology at University of Toronto at Mississauga.

Personal life 
His father was the celebrated scholar of religion Wilfred Cantwell Smith.

External links
 Brian Cantwell Smith 'On the Origin of Objects'

References

Year of birth missing (living people)
Living people
Massachusetts Institute of Technology alumni
American computer scientists
Academic staff of the University of Toronto
Duke University faculty
Scientists at PARC (company)
Stanford University Department of Philosophy faculty
Canada Research Chairs
Stanford University School of Engineering faculty
Scientists from Missouri